Christopher Horsey (born 11 July 1972) is an Australian entertainer, director, choreographer and performing arts teacher.

Early life
Horsey learnt to perform, teach and choreograph from his mother, Kay Horsey, who had a dance school for 26 years on the Gold Coast.

Horsey began his tap dancing career as a pre-teen in 1984 by finishing in first place in the age 9 to 12 category of the Fred Astaire International Tap and Jazz Championship at the Waldorf Astoria Hotel in New York City. At age 13 he appeared on the Australia television show Young Talent Time as their "Talent Discovery of the Week". At age 16 he performed in the "Ultimate Event" Frank Sinatra concert at Sanctuary Cove, Australia.

Career

Performer
Horsey has performed onstage since 1989 in productions including 42nd Street (original Australian cast), Funny Girl, West Side Story, Chicago and Singin' in the Rain.

Horsey rose to fame in the early 1990s as an original cast member of Hot Shoe Shuffle, "The first Australian musical with an all-Australian cast to make it to the West End", in which he originated the role of "Tip", touring Australia, New Zealand, Japan and the Queens Theatre in London. He continued working with Dein Perry, joining Tap Dogs on their North American tour which included six months at the Off-Broadway Union Square Theatre.

In 2000, he played the role of Angus in the Fox Searchlight Pictures film Bootmen alongside his friend and collaborator Adam Garcia, as well as Sam Worthington.

In 2007, Horsey portrayed Andy Lee in a limited showing of 42nd Street in Melbourne. In 2009, he played Lank Hawkins in Crazy For You.

In 2014, he plays the role of Benny Southstreet in Guys and Dolls and that same year he played conman Rooster in Annie.

Horsey has appeared in the independently produced Every Single Saturday at Glen Street Theatre and both choreographed and performed in Lifeforce, both written by Joanna Weinberg. In 2014, Horsey joined the cast of The Tap Pack for their Sydney season at the recently established Hayes Theatre in Potts Point and continued a small tour with the show until its debut in the Dunstan Playhouse at the Adelaide Cabaret Festival in 2015.

Horsey originated the role of Officer Peter Hammett and choreographed the New Musicals Australia production of The Detective's Handbook at the Hayes Theatre, directed by Jonathan Biggins.

Horsey has featured in five 'Neglected Musicals' shows, Girl Crazy, My Favorite Year, Seesaw, Nick & Nora and Lucky Stiff. Neglected Musicals are presented with scripts in hand, and with piano accompaniment after only a day's rehearsal.

Horsey presented Arts Friday on Eastside Radio for 5 years

Performances
42nd Street Ensemble
Hot Shoe Shuffle as 'Tip' (originated)
West Side Story as 'Big Deal'
Tap Dogs as '2IC'
Chicago as 'Harry'/'The Jury'
Singin' in the Rain as 'Sid Phillips' and first cover for 'Cosmo Brown'
42nd Street as 'Andy Lee'
Crazy For You as 'Lank Hawkins'
Guys and Dolls as 'Benny Southstreet'
The Tap Pack as 'Marty'
Kiss Me, Kate as 'Paul'
The Detective's Handbook as 'Officer Peter Hammett' (originated)

Director/Choreographer
Horsey is a 2017 Australian Dance Awards nominee in the 'Outstanding Achievement in Commercial Dance, Musicals or Physical Theatre' category, for his work on Swing on This, a show he has been directing and choreographing since its international debut at the 2014 Adelaide Cabaret Festival. The show stars Matt Lee, Ben Mingay, Luke Kennedy, Rob Mills and Michael Falzon. Swing on This is a collection of classic swing songs reworked with a more contemporary style, as well as more recent popular music arranged for an 18 piece big band.

Horsey was both choreographer and Resident Director for the 2016 Opera Queensland production of Kiss Me, Kate.

Horsey choreographed a new cabaret-style show, Everybody Loves Lucy, starring Elise McCann and choreographed Ruthless! at The Seymour Centre starring Katrina Retallick, Geraldine Turner, Margi De Feranti and Merideth O'Reilly on which he was also Resident Director.

In 2012, Horsey choreographed the opening sequence of the Helpmann Awards at the Sydney Opera House featuring host Simon Burke and Genevieve Lemon, Trevor Ashley, Peter Carroll and corps de ballet dancer Montana Rubin from The Australian Ballet.

Horsey performed in and choreographed Adam Garcia's 2010 and 2011 judges performance on Got To Dance, a British dance competition that was broadcast on Sky 1 in the United Kingdom and Ireland.
Horsey was commissioned by Northern Tap Company to create and choreograph a brand new Tap Dance show which he called Soundz Extraordinary for a one night only showing at The Civic Theatre in Barnsley (United Kingdom) on 24 September 2011.

Horsey choreographed 'Mickey's Christmas Big Band' show at Disneyland Paris and is resident choreographer for Carols in the Domain, broadcast on the Seven Network.

Performing Arts Teacher
Horsey teaches drama, musical theatre and tap dance.

He has taught and lectured at Queensland Conservatorium Griffith University, Sydney Dance Company, Academy of Music & Performing Arts (AMPA), Victorian College of the Arts (VCA), Excelsia College (formerly Wesley Institute), ED5 International and Brent Street School of Performing Arts

Awards

First Place - Fred Astaire International Tap & Jazz Championship 1984

People's Choice Award, Short Sweet & Dance Festival 2007 for his Seinfeld inspired Tap show 3 Hits and a Miss

Australian Dance Awards nominee in the 'Outstanding Achievement in Commercial Dance, Musicals or Physical Theatre' category, for his work on Swing on This 2017

Filmography

Personal life 

Horsey married Australian film, TV and stage actress Lucy Durack on Rottnest Island off the coast of Perth, Western Australia on 5 April 2014. They have a daughter, Polly Gladys and son Theodore Lindsay.

References

Living people
1972 births
Australian choreographers
Australian male musical theatre actors